The year 2009 is the second year in the history of Shark Fights, a mixed martial arts promotion based in the United States. In 2009 Shark Fights held 5 events beginning with, Shark Fights 3.

Events list

Shark Fights 3

Shark Fights 3 was an event held on March 14, 2009, at the Azteca Music Hall in Amarillo, Texas.

Results

Shark Fights 4: Richards vs Schoonover

Shark Fights 4: Richards vs Schoonover was an event held on May 2, 2009, at the Citibank Coliseum in Lubbock, Texas.

Results

Shark Fights 5.5: Nothing To Lose

Shark Fights 5.5: Nothing To Lose was an event held on July 18, 2009, at the Gamboa's Outdoor Event Center in Amarillo, Texas.

Results

Shark Fights 6: Stars & Stripes

Shark Fights 6: Stars & Stripes was an event held on September 12, 2009, at the Amarillo National Center in Amarillo, Texas.

Results

Shark Fights 7: Sursa vs Prangley

Shark Fights 7: Sursa vs Prangley was an event held on November 28, 2009, at the Azteca Music Hall in Amarillo, Texas.

Results

See also 
 Shark Fights

References

Shark Fights events
2009 in mixed martial arts